Lawrence Mervil Tibbett (November 16, 1896 – July 15, 1960) was an American opera singer and recording artist who also performed as a film actor and radio personality. A baritone, he sang leading roles with the Metropolitan Opera in New York City more than 600 times from 1923 to 1950. He performed diverse musical theatre roles, including Captain Hook in Peter Pan in a touring show.

Biography
Lawrence Tibbett was born Lawrence Mervil Tibbet (with a single final "t") on November 16, 1896, in Bakersfield, California. His father was a part-time deputy sheriff, killed in a shootout with outlaw Jim McKinney in 1903. Tibbett grew up in Los Angeles, earning money by singing in church choirs and at funerals. He graduated from Manual Arts High School in 1915. A year later, he met his future wife, Grace Mackay Smith, who rented a room in his mother's house. During World War I, he served in the Merchant Marine, after which he found employment singing as prologue to silent movies at the Grauman "Million Dollar" Theater in downtown Los Angeles.

Tibbett studied in New York City with Frank La Forge and in 1923 at the age of 26, he signed his first contract, for $60 per week, with the Metropolitan Opera, using the name "Tibbett". The Met mistakenly added the extra "t" to his last name on his contract and he decided to keep the new spelling. Over the ensuing years, with the Met, he built a hugely successful career, displaying an outstanding voice, immaculate musicianship, and a strong stage presence. He recorded exclusively for the Victor Talking Machine Company/RCA Victor for his entire career.

His Met roles included Valentin in Charles Gounod's Faust, Silvio, and later, Tonio, in Ruggiero Leoncavallo's Pagliacci and the King's Herald in Richard Wagner's Lohengrin. He first achieved national recognition playing Ford in Giuseppe Verdi's Falstaff. Tibbett traveled to California in 1927 to sing the lead role in the Grove Play St. Francis of Assisi, and it was during that trip to San Francisco when he met ex-New Yorker Jennie Marston Burgard (daughter of New York banker Edgar L. Marston), whom he married in 1932. During the 1930s, Tibbett toured Europe and Australia, performing on stage or giving recitals in London, Paris, Prague and Vienna as well as in Sydney and Melbourne.

Tibbett made his first recordings for the Victor Talking Machine Company in 1926.
In the early 1930s, Tibbett also appeared in movies. His sojourn in Hollywood proved brief, although he was nominated for the Academy Award for Best Actor for his first film, The Rogue Song, a 1930 Metro-Goldwyn-Mayer production with Laurel & Hardy, shot in two-color Technicolor (only a few minutes of footage of the film, as well as the complete soundtrack, is known to survive today). Soon after, he starred in another MGM musical film, New Moon, opposite Grace Moore and The Cuban Love Song (1931), with Lupe Vélez. In 1935, he made Metropolitan for 20th Century Fox. This film is notable for its extensive segments of Tibbett's performing operatic arias in a stage setting. He also starred in the film The Prodigal in 1931 with Esther Ralston and Roland Young in which he sings "Without a Song." His final film was Under Your Spell in 1936. Also during the 1930s, Tibbett had a domestic radio program sponsored by the Packard Motor Car Company of America on which he sang formal music. The company chose him to announce the Packard 120 to the world on air; he drove one. When the firm wanted to sell less expensive cars, they persuaded him to add popular tunes to his repertoire in order to boost sales. He also appeared on Your Hit Parade.

In 1936, with violinist Jascha Heifetz, he founded the American Guild of Musical Artists, the most important labor union for solo performing artists. He was the guild's proactive president for 17 years. His forceful and articulate advocacy of artistic causes was unique in its day.

In January 1937, during a rehearsal onstage at the Met for the opera Caponsacchi, Tibbett accidentally stabbed a long-time member of the chorus, Joseph Sterzini, during a fight scene. Sterzini died later that day.

After his operatic career concluded, Tibbett performed in musicals and plays in the early 1950s. He spent a summer in stock as the Reverend Davidson in Rain and played Captain Hook in a short-lived tour of the John Burrell staging of Peter Pan that was mounted for Jean Arthur and featured a musical score by the young Leonard Bernstein. Veronica Lake played Peter. Most notably, Tibbett took over the Italian operatic bass Ezio Pinza's role in Fanny during its original run on Broadway.

Later years and death
In later years Tibbett served as host of a radio show featuring historic recordings of operatic singers. He leavened matters with reminiscences of his own stage experiences. Suffering from severe arthritis and years of heavy drinking, he aged prematurely as his health worsened. He died on July 15, 1960, after hitting his head on a table during a fall in his apartment.
The Time obituary said of him:
"Tibbett had a big, bronzelike, dramatically eloquent voice that combined ringing power with remarkable agility ... he left behind not only the echoes of a great voice but the memory of a performer who could feel equally at home with high art and popular entertainment, suggesting that there is a magical link between the two." He is interred at Forest Lawn Memorial Park in Glendale, California.

Tibbett's operatic recordings made in the United States during the 1920s and 1930s are regarded as among the better performances of this period. Many of these recordings are available on LP and CD re-issues. Dear Rogue: A Biography of the American Baritone Lawrence Tibbett, a comprehensive story of his personal life and musical career, by Hertzel Weinstat and Bert Wechsler was published in 1996 by Amadeus Press of Portland, Oregon.

Famous roles

Although regarded as a dashing, compelling actor as well, Tibbett's true fame stems from the fact that he has long been considered to be, in terms of sheer voice, one of the better baritones to appear at the Metropolitan Opera. His voice was large, with a dark timbre approaching that of a bass, and he commanded a full range of dynamics in his prime, from powerful fortes to delicate pianissimos. He was renowned for his affinity with the works of Verdi, notably his breakthrough role of Ford in Falstaff, the title role in Simon Boccanegra, and Iago in Otello. He was also an imposing, sinister Scarpia in Puccini's Tosca, a swaggering Escamillo in Bizet's Carmen, and a powerful Tonio in Leoncavallo's Pagliacci.

In addition, Tibbett created leading roles in a number of American operas, including Louis Gruenberg's The Emperor Jones, based on Eugene O'Neill's play. (He sang this in blackface; the character of Brutus Jones is an African-American). He starred in Howard Hanson's Merry Mount, as well as The King's Henchman and Peter Ibbetson, operas by Deems Taylor. Tibbett performed the roles of Porgy and Jake in the first album of selections from George Gershwin's Porgy and Bess, two roles which, on stage, usually are performed by black singers. Gershwin was present at the recording sessions. Continuing in this vein, Tibbett made a recording of Jerome Kern and Oscar Hammerstein II's song Ol' Man River from Show Boat.

Awards and portrayals
 Lawrence Tibbett was pictured on a set of United States postage stamps in the "Legends of American Music series", celebrating opera singers.
 The year he died, Tibbett was made a posthumous member of the charter class of honorees in the Hollywood Walk of Fame. His star is located at 6300 Hollywood Boulevard, recognizing his contributions to the music industry.
 Though he was a pioneer in musical film, his star honors him as a recording artist.
 Tibbett, whose Beverly Hills, California, home mobster Bugsy Siegel was renting at the time Siegel was shot to death on June 20, 1947, is portrayed briefly as a character in the 1991 film Bugsy, although the actor portraying him was shorter and pudgier than the real person.
 A full-length biography of Tibbett, titled Dear Rogue by Hertzel Weinstat and Bert Wechsler, was published in 1996.

References

Sources
 The Concise Oxford Dictionary of Opera, corrected Second Edition, edited by Rosenthal and Warwick, London, 1980.
 The Lawrence Tibbett Papers, a portion of the singer's personal papers, in the Music Division of The New York Public Library for the Performing Arts.
 Dear Rogue, by Weinstat and Wechsler, Portland, Oregon, 1996.

External links
 
 
 Photograph of Tibbett, summer of 1927. Online Archive of California.
 
 Lawrence Tibbett Collection (ARS.0041), Stanford Archive of Recorded Sound
 Lawrence Tibbett papers (primarily containing photographs) in the Music Division of The New York Public Library for the Performing Arts.
 Lawrence Tibbett recordings at the Discography of American Historical Recordings.

1896 births
1960 deaths
American operatic baritones
Musicians from Bakersfield, California
Burials at Forest Lawn Memorial Park (Glendale)
Male actors from Bakersfield, California
Musicians from Los Angeles
Accidental deaths from falls
Singers from California
20th-century American male opera singers
Classical musicians from California
Presidents of the American Federation of Television and Radio Artists